Rafał Kurmański  (August 22, 1982 in Poland – May 30, 2004 in Zielona Góra, Poland) was a Polish speedway rider who was 2nd in 2001 Individual Under-19 European Championship.

Speedway Grand Prix results

Career

Individual World Championship 
 2003 - 36th place (3 points)

Individual World U-21 Championship 
 2002 - 6th place (10 points)
 2003 - 7th place (8 points)

Individual U-19 European Championship
2001 - Runner-up (13 points)

Individual Polish Championship 
 2001 - 15th place in Semi-Final
 2002 - 6th place (7 points)

Polish U-21 Pairs Championship 
 2001 - Polish Champion
 2002 - 2nd place

Team U-21 Polish Championship 
 2000 - 3rd place
 2003 - 3rd place

Silver Helmet (U-21) 
 2002 - 2nd place

See also 
 Poland speedway team
 List of Speedway Grand Prix riders
 List of suicides

1982 births
2004 suicides
People from Zielona Góra
Polish speedway riders
Suicides by hanging in Poland
Sportspeople from Lubusz Voivodeship
2004 deaths